Darko Stanojević (born 30 September 1997), is a Serbian professional soccer player who plays as a midfielder or defender for Loznica. for  He also holds Australian citizenship.

References

External links

1997 births
Living people
Serbian footballers
Association football midfielders
Perth Glory FC players
Australian people of Serbian descent